Swallowwort or swallow-wort is a common name for several plants and plant families.  The term may be a description of poisonous effects, or indicate that a plant was formerly used medicinally for tonsillitis.

It may refer to:

 Any of several vines of the genus Vincetoxicum, especially white swallowwort (Vincetoxicum hirundinaria), black swallowwort (Vincetoxicum nigrum), and pale swallowwort (Vincetoxicum rossicum)
 Any of several vines of the genus Cynanchum. Cynanchum is from Greek words meaning "to choke a dog."
 Greater celandine (Chelidonium majus).
 Greater celandine and swallowwort were each often categorized with tetterworts because they were used to treat tetter.  This led to nomenclature confusion among these worts.
 many plants of the genus Asclepias
 Euphorbia maculata
 Seutera angustifolia, a plant of the genus Seutera